The 1938 Washington University Bears football team was an American football team that represented Washington University in St. Louis as a member of the Missouri Valley Conference (MVC) during the 1938 college football season. In its seventh season under head coach Jimmy Conzelman, the team compiled a 6–3–1 record (2–1–1 against MVC opponents) and outscored opponents by a total of 242 to 94. The team played its home games at Francis Field in St. Louis.

Schedule

References

Washington University
Washington University Bears football seasons
Washington University Bears football